Lyudmila Vasilyevna Shapovalova-Aksyonova (also transliterated Aksenova, born 23 April 1947 in Sevastopol) is a Soviet athlete who competed mainly in the 400 metres, training at VSS Avanhard in Kiev.

She competed for Soviet Union in the 1976 Summer Olympics held in Montreal, Quebec, Canada in the 4 x 400 metres where she won the bronze medal with her teammates Inta Kļimoviča, Natalya Sokolova and Nadezhda Ilyina.

References 

 Liudmyla Aksenova at Olympics at Sports-Reference.com

External links 
 
 

1947 births
Soviet female sprinters
Olympic bronze medalists for the Soviet Union
Athletes (track and field) at the 1976 Summer Olympics
Olympic athletes of the Soviet Union
Living people
Ukrainian female sprinters
Sportspeople from Sevastopol
Medalists at the 1976 Summer Olympics
Olympic bronze medalists in athletics (track and field)
Olympic female sprinters